The Salvador Primera División de Fútbol Profesional Apertura 2002 season (officially "Torneo Apertura 2002") started on August 3, 2002.

Primera División de Fútbol Profesional Apertura 2002 season was composed of the following clubs:

 C.D. FAS
 C.D. Municipal Limeño
 San Salvador F.C.
 C.D. Águila
 C.D. Luis Ángel Firpo
 A.D. Isidro Metapán
 C.D. Atlético Balboa
 Alianza F.C.
 Arcense
 C.D. Dragón

Team information

Personnel and sponsoring

Managerial changes

Before the season

During the season

Apertura 2002 Standings
Last updated August 3, 2002

4th place playoff

Semifinals 1st Leg

Semifinals 2nd Leg

Final

List of foreign players in the league
This is a list of foreign players in Apertura 2002. The following players:
have played at least one apetura game for the respective club.
have not been capped for the El Salvador national football team on any level, independently from the birthplace

C.D. Águila
  Alexandre Pinto Larangueira
  Severino Piñeiro
  Alexander Prediguer
  Toninho Dos Santos
  Sandro Machado Tavares 
  Mauro Nunez
  Darío Larrosa

Alianza F.C.
  Martín Claudio Sosa
  Marcelino Renterí
  Hermes Martínez Misal
  Martin Garcia

Atletico Balboa
  Alessandro Rodríguez
  Luis Carlos Asprilla
  Santiago Rodríguez Silva
  Ernesto Noel Aquino
  Jair Camero

Arcense
  John Polo
  Edilson Chávez
  Libardo Carvajal
  Christian Mitri
  German Rodríguez

Dragon
   José Caicedo
   Luis Marines
  Andrés Molina
  Eduardo Arriola
  Óscar Lagos

 (player released mid season)
  (player Injured mid season)
 Injury replacement player

C.D. FAS
  Alejandro de la Cruz Bentos
  Williams Reyes
  Rolando Corella
  Víctor Hugo Mafla 

C.D. Luis Ángel Firpo
  Juan Carlos Graf
  Norman García
  Frank Rengifo
  Henry Sevillano
  Max Torres
  Juan Pablo Chacón

A.D. Isidro Metapán
  Cristian Javier Zamudio
  Diego Alvarez
  Diego Oyarbide
  Luciano Suárez 
  Alonso Alcibar 
  Anderson Batista
  Jorge Wagner

Municipal Limeno
  Paulo César Rodrigues
  Raul Falero
  Jorge Sandoval
  Hugo Viveros

San Salvador F.C.
  Rodrigo Lagos
  Emiliano Pedrozo
  Alexander Obregon
  Orlando Garces
  Franklin Webster

External links

Primera División de Fútbol Profesional Apertura seasons
El
1